"Hotel" is a song by American rapper Cassidy, released by J Records and Swizz Beatz's Full Surface label as his commercial debut single on September 29, 2003. The song also serves as the lead single from his debut album, Split Personality. The track was produced by Swizz Beatz and features R. Kelly on featured vocals. "Hotel" reached number four on the US Billboard Hot 100 and number three on the UK Singles Chart.

Remix
The official remix of the song, the "Vacation" remix, features R. Kelly singing a new intro along with new lyrics on the chorus. The remix also features American rapper Trina on the second verse, as well as new verses by Cassidy. The remix was included as the final track from Cassidy's debut album, Split Personality. Another version featuring Kool Savas was also recorded and included on one of the European maxi-CD singles.

Track listings

US 12-inch single
A1. "Hotel" (main mix) – 4:38
A2. "Hotel" (instrumental) – 4:38
B1. "Hotel" (club mix) – 4:44
B2. "Hotel" (acappella) – 4:36

UK and European CD single
 "Hotel" (featuring R. Kelly) – 4:07
 "Take It" – 3:04

UK 12-inch single and Australian CD single
 "Hotel" (featuring R. Kelly) – 4:07
 "Hotel" (Vacation remix featuring R. Kelly and Trina) – 4:10 (5:46 in Australia)
 "Hotel" (Vacation remix instrumental version) – 4:00 (5:06 in Australia)
 "Take It" – 3:04

European maxi-CD single 1
 "Hotel" (featuring R. Kelly) – 4:07
 "Hotel" (Vacation remix featuring R. Kelly and Trina) – 5:46
 "Take It" (dirty version) – 3:04
 "Hotel" (featuring R. Kelly and Kool Savas) – 4:07

European maxi-CD single 2
 "Hotel" (featuring R. Kelly) – 4:07
 "Hotel" (Vacation remix featuring R. Kelly and Trina) – 5:46
 "Take It" – 3:04
 "Hotel" (instrumental version) – 4:38

Charts

Weekly charts

Year-end charts

Release history

References

2003 debut singles
2003 songs
Cassidy (rapper) songs
Epic Records singles
R. Kelly songs
Song recordings produced by Swizz Beatz
Songs written by Bernard Edwards
Songs written by Nile Rodgers
Songs written by R. Kelly
Songs written by Swizz Beatz